Jones v. United States 137 U.S. 202 (1890) is a United States Supreme Court case in which the court held that the Guano Islands Act, which states that any island that fell under the act was under the jurisdiction of any existing statues or laws pertaining to high seas, was constitutional. The case originated from claims the United States government could not prosecute Henry Jones for a murder committed on Navassa Island during a worker riot.

Background
The Guano Islands Act, passed in 1856, allowed any American to claim as property of the United States any unclaimed island that contained deposits of guano. These lands would be proclaimed territory of the United States and, according to Section 6 of the act, any crimes or offenses committed on or adjacent to these islands "shall be deemed committed on the high seas, on board a merchant ship or vessel belonging to the United States; and shall be punished according to the laws of the United States relating to such ships or vessels and offenses on the high seas ..."

As of 1857 Navassa Island, claimed under the Guano Islands Act, was under the ownership of the Navassa Phosphate Company of Baltimore. By 1889 the company had a reported 148 workers on the island for the purpose of mining. Under reports of hazardous work conditions, a riot among the miners broke out. During the riot five supervisors died and 18 workers returned to Baltimore on a U.S. warship to await three separate trials on the charges of murder. The Order of Galilean Fishermen, a Black fraternal society, decided to fund the defense of the miners.

Facts of the case
In the specific case of worker Henry Jones, he was charged with the murder of Thomas N. Foster. The defense claimed the accused were justified in their action under the contention that Jones acted in self defense, and that the United States did not have jurisdiction over the island.
 
The Maryland court dismissed these claims and, under the charges of murder, sentenced the defendant with the death penalty.

Appeals
The case was appealed from the Maryland District Court to the United States Court of Appeals for the Fourth Circuit, which was appealed up to the Supreme Court.

Decision
The court examined the issue as to whether the Guano Islands Act, specifically on the point of whether jurisdiction of US Law, applied to Navassa Island and thus the accused murders. The court claimed it did. Justice Horace Gray, wrote the decision of the court. He stated that due to acts and amendments from Congress, any crime committed on the high seas would be directed and subject to trial within the state that the territorial waters belong to or the state in which the accused originates from. On this, Gray claims Jones was able to be tried despite not being within an incorporated state when the crime was committed. Because of this reasoning, it was concluded that Section 6 of the Guano Islands Act was in line with settled law.

It was then stated that Navassa Island fell within the act as it had confirmed supplies of guano and thus fell within all the rules and conditions stated within the act. Thus the court affirmed the decisions of the lower courts to charge Jones with murder and he was subsequently sentenced to death.

Aftermath
Jones v. United States (1890) was a contentious case publicly at the time. Many saw it as a case of worker and Blacks rights against White overseers as all the supervisors killed on Navassa Island were White, and all those charged with murder were people of color.

While the court upheld Henry Jones' death sentence, efforts by Black-run organizations and communities, as well as White jurors from the trials, to have the sentence commuted eventually reached President Benjamin Harrison. Harrison subsequently commuted the sentences to prison time and the case was brought up in the 1891 State of the Union Address.

See also
List of United States Supreme Court cases, volume 137

References 

United States Supreme Court cases
Guano Islands Act
United States Supreme Court cases of the Fuller Court